Curtis Brown is a literary and talent agency based in London, UK. One of the oldest literary agencies in Europe, it was founded by Albert Curtis Brown in 1899. It is part of The Curtis Brown Group of companies.

History
Albert Curtis Brown was an American journalist who was the London correspondent for The New York Press. He also ran a press syndication agency. Because of his extensive contacts in both the UK and America, he fell into representing authors who were looking for publishing opportunities on the two continents.

The first deal he transacted was selling serial rights in John Oliver Hobbes’s The Vineyard. The literary agency element of Brown’s business was accommodated alongside his press agency in Henrietta Street, Covent Garden. In 1914, Curtis Brown opened its first international office in New York; subsequently, offices were opened in Paris, Berlin, Milan and Copenhagen и. Brown believed in the exchange of literature between countries as a point of principle to foster international understanding. The company retains a translation rights department to this day.

During this period, Brown carried out agency business on behalf of a large number of well-known writers such as Kenneth Grahame, AA Milne and DH Lawrence. It also worked on behalf of prominent figures of the day including Winston Churchill, David Lloyd George and U.S. President Woodrow Wilson.

Curtis Brown wrote an autobiography called Contacts – published by Cassell in 1935. He ran the agency until 1935 when he was succeeded by his son Spencer Curtis Brown. Spencer ran the agency until his retirement in 1968 when he sold it to an investment company.

The agency was instrumental in establishing the reputations of several British and American writers, including John Steinbeck, William Faulkner, Norman Mailer, C P Snow, Angus Wilson, Lawrence Durrell, Gerald Durrell, Kingsley Amis, Elizabeth Bowen, and Isaiah Berlin.

In 1953 Spencer Curtis Brown Black head hunted Kitty Black and she became chief play reader at Curtis Brown. She played golf and used her connections to find clients that included Somerset Maugham and Samuel Beckett. She was involved with the noted production of Samuel Beckett's Waiting for Godot in 1956. She notably told John Osborne to "think again" about his play Look Back in Anger that would later transform British theatre.

The agency was bought back by its management team in 1982.

In 1995, Jonathan Lloyd was recruited from the publishers HarperCollins to become managing director and two years later Nick Marston joined from rival agents AP Watt to begin the new film, theatre and television department.

A further buy-out in 2001-2002 resulted in the present ownership of the agency by its management.

Recent history

Curtis Brown underwent a management buyout in 2002, when agents Jonny Geller, Ben Hall, Jonathan Lloyd, Peter Robinson and Nick Marston bought the company from the then senior director shareholders at the agency. In the same year Sarah Spear, Jacquie Drewe and their teams joined Curtis Brown from London Management to form what is now known as Curtis Brown's Talent Department.

In 2008, Curtis Brown and ICM (International Creative Management) inked a deal for Curtis Brown to represent ICM’s clients in the UK and across the world.

In addition to its books, actors, presenters, theatre and television departments, the company has a film production arm launched in 2008, Cuba Pictures, headed by Nick Marston as CEO and with Dixie Linder as Head of Film and Television.

In May 2012, the company restructured its management team with Jonathan Lloyd becoming Chairman and with Ben Hall and Jonny Geller becoming joint Chief Executives.
Curtis Brown also runs a creative writing school, Curtis Brown Creative, directed by Anna Davis. CBC courses span across creative and screen writing.

In March 2013, Curtis Brown acquired a major stake in leading literary agency Conville and Walsh, finally acquiring the company in early 2015.

Curtis Brown was acquired by The Curtis Brown Group (formerly Original Talent) in 2016 as its first and flagship acquisition.

Jonny Geller remains as Chairman of Curtis Brown as well as CEO of The Curtis Brown Group.

Further acquisitions by The Curtis Brown Group include Ed Victor Ltd and Debi Allen's DAA Management (2017), Meryl Hoffman Management, Tavistock Wood, Open Book Productions (2018), and Markham Froggatt and Irwin (2020).

In June 2022, United Talent Agency (UTA) acquired The Curtis Brown Group.

Clients

Novelists and non-fiction writers
Margaret Atwood
Tony Benn, British politician and diarist
Isaiah Berlin, British philosopher and historian of ideas
Tracy Chevalier
Winston Churchill
Jilly Cooper
Susanna Clarke, British author best known for Jonathan Strange & Mr Norrell
Lauren Davies, novelist and screenwriter
Michael de Larrabeiti, author of The Borrible Trilogy
Daphne du Maurier, English author and playwright
Gerald Durrell
Lawrence Durrell
Antonia Fraser
Ian Fleming
Charles Gidley Wheeler
Kenneth Grahame
James Hilton
Walter Isaacson
Howard Jacobson, British novelist who won the Man Booker Prize in 2010 for The Finkler Question
Marian Keyes
Hari Kunzru
John le Carré
David Lodge
Emily St. John Mandel
Somerset Maugham
A. A. Milne
David Mitchell, English novelist, author of Cloud Atlas
Santa Montefiore
Jojo Moyes
David Nicholls, English novelist and screenwriter, author of One Day
Tony Parsons, British journalist, author and broadcaster
Maria Ressa, 2021 Nobel Peace Prize Winner
John H. Ritter, author best known for The Boy Who Saved Baseball
Vita Sackville-West
Tom Rob Smith, British novelist best known for Child 44
Zeb Soanes, author and broadcaster
Edward Stourton, novelist and journalist

Playwrights
Samuel Beckett
Alecky Blythe
James Graham
Conor McPherson
Nick Payne
R. C. Sherriff
Colin Teevan

Screenwriters
Hossein Amini
Kevin Cecil, co-writer of Channel 4 sitcom Black Books
 S J Clarkson
Damon Beesley, co-writer of E4 sitcom The Inbetweeners
Iain Morris, co writer of E4 sitcom The Inbetweeners
Andy Riley, co-writer of Channel 4 sitcom Black Books
Tony Roche, co-writer of BBC TV series The Thick of It
David Wolstencroft, creator of the BBC series, Spooks

TV presenters
Clive Anderson, comedy and current affairs presenter for TV and radio
Duncan Bannatyne, presenter best known for BBC TV's Dragon's Den
James Hyman, DJ, music supervisor and TV presenter
Carol Klein, garden writer and newspaper columnist, best known for presenting BBC TV's Gardener's World
Gareth Malone, music documentary presenter for radio and television
Annie Nightingale, DJ, music and popular culture presenter for TV and radio
Alex Polizzi, travel and property presenter for television;
Paul Whitehouse, comedian, writer and presenter

Actors and actresses
Sara Vickers, Theatre, TV and film actress and voiceover artist, best known for playing Joan Thursday in the British television detective drama series Endeavour 
Sophie McShera, English actress known for her roles in Waterloo Road and Downton Abbey.
Dev Patel, British film and television actor best known for his roles in Skins and Slumdog Millionaire
Robert Pattinson, English actor best known for his role in Twilight
Lorraine Bruce, English television, film and stage actress and Singer best known for her role in The Syndicate
Thomas Sangster, British film and television actor best known for his roles in Love Actually, Nanny McPhee, The Last Legion and the voice of Ferb in Phineas and Ferb.
Kaya Scodelario, English actress and model best known for her role in Skins
Adam Long, British actor, probably best known for his appearance as Lewis Whippey in Happy Valley.
Sheridan Smith, English actress, singer and dancer best known for her role in Two Pints of Lager and a Packet of Crisps.
Stanley Tucci, American character actor, writer, producer and film director best known for his role in The Lovely Bones.
Alicia Silverstone, American actress best known for her role in Batman & Robin.
Tom Payne, British actor best known for his role in The Walking Dead (TV series).
Dominic Sherwood, English actor and model best known for his role in Shadowhunters.
Nico Mirallegro, English actor best known for his role in The Village.
Nicola Coughlan, Irish actress best known for her role in the upcoming Derry Girls Channel 4.
Julie Christie, British actress best known for her role in Billy Liar (film).
Janet McTeer, English actress best known for her role in A Doll's House.
Harry Enfield, English comedian, actor, writer, and director, best known for his sketch show Harry Enfield's Television Programme.
Gugu Mbatha-Raw, British stage and film actress best known for her role in Belle (2013).
Stellan Skarsgård, Swedish actor best known for his role in Breaking the Waves.
Douglas Booth, English actor best known for his role in  Romeo and Juliet (2013 film).
Sam Neill, Northern Ireland born New Zealand actor best known for his role in Jurassic Park.
Iwan Rheon, Welsh actor, singer and musician best known for his role in Game of Thrones.
Siobhan Finneran, English television and film actress best known for her role in Downton Abbey.
Tom Sturridge, English actor best known for his role in Being Julia.
Nico Parker, English actress best known for her role in Dumbo (2019)
Ella Purnell, English actress known for her appearance in Miss Peregrine's Home for Peculiar Children (film).
Alex Kingston, English actress best known for her role in Doctor Who as River Song (Doctor Who). 
Harry Lloyd, English actor best known for his appearance as Viserys Targaryen in Game of Thrones. 
Mark Gatiss, English actor, comedian, screenwriter and novelist best known as Mycroft Holmes in Sherlock (TV series).
Craig Roberts, Welsh actor and director, best known for playing Oliver Tate in Submarine (2010 film).
Cush Jumbo, English actress and writer known for her role in The Good Wife.
Richard Schiff, American actor and comedian best known for his role in The West Wing.
Sam Reid, Australian born British actor  best known for his role in Belle (2013 film).
Erin Richards, Welsh actress best known for her appearance as Barbara Kean in Gotham (TV series).
Phoebe Fox, English actress best known for her role in Switch (UK TV series)
Eleanor Worthington Cox, English actress best known for her role in Matilda the Musical and Britannia (TV series)
Oscar Kennedy, English actor best known for his role in Ladhood

Former personnel
Kitty Black, literary agent, 1953-?
Naomi Burton Stone, literary agent, 1939–65  
Giles Gordon, literary agent, 1994-2003

The Curtis Brown Prize
The Curtis Brown Prize was established in 2006 in memory of agent Giles Gordon (1940-2003). Worth £1,500, it is awarded annually for the best writer of prose fiction on the University of East Anglia MA in Creative Writing (Prose Fiction) course, based on the material submitted by students for their MA assessment. The winner is chosen by a panel of Curtis Brown agents from a shortlist comprising all students in the year who achieve an MA with distinction. The inaugural award was made to Joe Dunthorne in 2006 for his novel Submarine. Other recipients are: Tamara Britten (2007), Daniel Timms (2008), Lauren Owen (2009), Gillian Daly (2010), Chelsey Flood (2011), Charlotte Stretch (2012).

References

External links
Curtis Brown Group Ltd official website
 Curtis Brown Creative Writing School official website
 Cuba Pictures official website
Finding aid to the Curtis Brown Ltd. records at Columbia University. Rare Book & Manuscript Library.

Talent and literary agencies
British literary agencies
Entertainment companies established in 1899
British companies established in 1899
1899 establishments in England
Mass media companies based in London
2022 mergers and acquisitions
British subsidiaries of foreign companies